Ishaq Kurikkal is a former member of the Kerala Legislative Assembly who, from 1984 to 2006, represented Manjeri of Malappuram district in Kerala.  He stepped down as Chairman and Councillor of the Manjeri municipality on 23 April 2013.

References

Indian Union Muslim League politicians
Members of the Kerala Legislative Assembly
Living people
Year of birth missing (living people)
Manjeri
People from Malappuram district